Conroy is an Irish surname.

Overview

Conroy is an Irish surname of multiple origins. In some cases it is the form used by descendants of the Ó Maolchonaire bardic family of what is now East Galway and South Roscommon. In west County Galway, most bearers of the name are probably descended from the Mac Conraoi family of Delbhna Tír Dhá Locha. This latter Irish family name was often anglicised into King due to the phonological similarity with the word rí. The Ó Cingeadh/Ó Cionga bardic family from east of Loch Ree also had their name corrupted into King, but for English phonological reasons.

Bearers of the surname

 Al Conroy (born 1966), Canadian ice hockey player
 Anthony Conroy (1895–1978), American ice hockey player
 Bill Conroy (catcher) (1915–1997), American baseball player
 Caroline Conroy (born 1977), Lord Mayor of Dublin
 Craig Conroy (born 1971), American ice hockey player
 Crispin Conroy (born 1963), Australian diplomat
 David Conroy (born 1937), British television producer
 Don Conroy, Irish author
 Donald Conroy (1921–1998), American Marine Corps colonel
 Ed Conroy (basketball), American basketball coach
 Ed Conroy (politician), Canadian politician
 Edward T. Conroy, American politician
 Frances Conroy (born 1953), American actress
 Frank Conroy (1936–2005), American author
 Frank Conroy (actor) (1890–1964), British-American film and stage actor
 Harry Conroy (1943–2010), Scottish trade union leader and journalist
 Jack Conroy (1898–1990), leftist American writer
 Jarlath Conroy (born 1944), Irish actor
 Jim Conroy, American actor and television writer 
 Sir John Conroy (1786–1854), British army officer, a significant figure in Queen Victoria's childhood
 Katrine Conroy, Canadian politician
 Kevin Conroy (1955–2022), American actor
 Kevin C. Conroy (born 1960), American businessman
 M. Joseph Conroy (1874–1958), mayor of Anchorage, Alaska 1923–1924
 Mark Conroy, Australian actor
 Martin Conroy (1922–2006), American advertising executive
 Mickey Conroy (1927–2005), American politician
 Mike Conroy (writer), co-creator of the Eagle Awards
 Mike Conroy (footballer born 1965), Scottish footballer
 Millington Conroy (born 1952), collector of Marilyn Monroe artifacts
 Pat Conroy (1945–2016), Irish-American author
 Pat Conroy (politician) (born 1979), Australian politician
 Patricia Conroy, Canadian country music singer/songwriter
 Robert Conroy, American novelist
 Ruaidhri Conroy (born 1979), Irish actor
 Ryan Conroy (born 1987), Scottish footballer
 Stephen Conroy (born 1964), Scottish artist
 Stephen Conroy (born 1963), Australian Senator
 Terry Conroy (born 1946), Irish footballer
 Tim Conroy (born 1960), American baseball player
 Tom Conroy (born 1962), member of the Massachusetts House of Representatives
 Will Conroy (born 1982), American basketball player
 Tommy Conroy (Dublin footballer), Gaelic football player
 William "Wid" Conroy, American baseball player
Conroy as a given name may refer to:
 Conroy Maddox (1912–2005), English surrealist painter, collagist, writer and lecturer
 Francis Conroy Sullivan (1882–1929), Canadian architect
 John Conroy Hutcheson (1840–1897), British author

See also
 Conroy, Iowa, a small community in the central United States
 Conry, a disambiguation page for people and places named Conry

References

Anglicised Irish-language surnames
Surnames of Irish origin